Alfred Charles Hanlon  (1 August 1866 – 6 February 1944) was a New Zealand lawyer, who, according to the Dictionary of New Zealand Biography, "was one of the most outstanding criminal advocates in New Zealand's history". He was born in Dunedin, New Zealand, where he lived and died, though he represented clients nationwide. Hanlon represented at least 16 people charged with murder, but he is best known for his first defence case, in which he represented the only woman to be hanged in New Zealand, Minnie Dean. Dean was the only murder defendant of Hanlon's to be hanged.

Hanlon's career was the subject of a 1985 New Zealand television drama series, called Hanlon. The series was a critical and a commercial success, and was nominated for Best Overseas Program at the 1986 Emmy Awards. Its first episode, In Defence of Minnie Dean, "contributed to a re-evaluation of Dean's conviction", and won the Best Director, Best Drama Programme, Drama Script, and Performance, Female, in a Dramatic Role categories at the 1986 Listener Television Awards (also called the GOFTA Awards). David Gwillim, who played Hanlon, won Best Performance, Male, in a Dramatic Role at the awards for his performance in the series, and Terry Gray's music won Best Original Music.

References

External links
In Defence of Minnie Dean, the first episode of the Hanlon television series, streamed free at NZ On Screen
Hanlon, 1985 New Zealand television drama series

1866 births
1944 deaths
Lawyers from Dunedin
Burials at Andersons Bay Cemetery
New Zealand King's Counsel